Emar Lakes Provincial Park is a provincial park in British Columbia, Canada.

References

Provincial parks of British Columbia
Geography of the Cariboo
Bonaparte Country
1996 establishments in British Columbia
Protected areas established in 1966